Yomi Adegoke (born 9 September 1991) is a British journalist and co-author of the 2018 book Slay In Your Lane.

Early life and education 
Adegoke is of Nigerian heritage. She was born in Canning Town, east London, and raised in Croydon. She attended the University of Warwick and studied law. Her sister, Yemisi Adegoke, is a journalist for BBC Africa. She took a year out of university and in 2013 she founded Birthday Magazine, a publication aimed at black teenage girls. The magazine discussed race, pop culture and feminism.

Career 
Adegoke has written for The Guardian, The Independent and the Pool. She was selected by The Dots as a woman who was "redefining the creative industry". An Evening Standard feature included her among "frontline pioneers". She has called out racism on university campuses. She worked for Channel 4.

Slay in Your Lane 

Adegoke collaborated with Elizabeth Uviebinené to write Slay in Your Lane: The Black Girl Bible. Nine publishers fought for the rights to the book, with Adegoke and Uviebinené winning five-figure sums. It was published by 4th Estate (HarperCollins) in 2018. It was described as a "guide to life for a generation of black women". To write the book, Adegoke and Uviebinené interviewed several accomplished black women, including Malorie Blackman, Denise Lewis, jamelia, Laura Mvula, Clara Amfo, Karen Blackett, June Sarpong, Margaret Busby and Estelle. The book covers work, education, money, dating and health, as well as media representation of black women. It was selected by BBC Radio 4 as Book of the Week in July 2018. They discussed the book at the Southbank Centre for the London Literature Festival. The pair have discussed the success of the book widely, in mainstream media and public discussions. Complementing the book, in April 2020 Adegoke and Uviebinené launched the Slay in Your Lane: The Podcast, which continued the analysis of news and popular culture topics from a black British female perspective.

Black Love
Adegoke has created Black Love, a comedy documentary for Black History Month on Channel 4 which Mo Gilligan is set to present.

References 

Living people
1991 births
Alumni of the University of Warwick
English journalists
English people of Nigerian descent
English people of Yoruba descent
English women non-fiction writers
People from Croydon